Pottu is a 2019 Indian Tamil-language horror comedy film written and directed by Vadivudaiyan. The film stars Bharath, Namitha, Srushti Dange and Ineya. With music composed by Amresh Ganesh, the film is produced by John Max for Shalom Studios. Pottu is a movie, following along the lines of this producer-director combo's earlier movie Sowkarpettai (2016). The film was launched in January 2016 and released on 8 March 2019. It is dubbed in Telugu and released on 8 March 2019 as Bottu and in Hindi as Bindi. Hindi dubbed version rights is owned by Dimension Pictures. The film opened to negative reviews.

Synopsis
The film revolves around two MBBS students, Arjun (Bharath) and Nithya (Srushti Dange). Arjun secures the first rank fraudulently, but Nithya, despite being a brilliant student, ends up holding the second rank. Both students join the same college, Arjun didn't write anything in paper and by the intension of changing paper of the college he went to college for changing paper and end up in getting caught that night he was punish to be at college and next day he was have to face the HOD of various departments for questioning at that mid night while drinking he gets angry on his friend and throws bottle and the piece of glass bounce back and cutting his hand. Things take a turn when his blood spills on a tomb of Pottu (Ineya), and a mysterious power enters his body which forces him to behave like a girl. What follows is the unraveling of the mystery behind Pottu and what she desires.

Cast

 Bharath as Arjun
 Srushti Dange as Nithya
 Namitha as Bhrameshwari
 Ineya as Pottu
 Urvashi as Mohana, Arjun's mother
 Thambi Ramaiah as Arjun's father
 Shakeela as Biochemistry Professor
 Nirosha as Pathology Professor
 Rajendran as Poonandi
 Mansoor Ali Khan as Swami
 Bharani as Arjun's classmate
 Sayaji Shinde as Dr. RK
 Swaminathan as Thief
 Nikesh Ram as Pottu's father
 Aryan as Veeraiah
 Kalidoss as Human Anatomy Professor
 Raviraj as Physiology Professor
 Bava Lakshmanan as Parrot Astrologer
 Bayilvan Ranganathan as Police Inspector
 V. M. Subburaj as Swami's assistant
 Bobby as Salim Bhai
 Scissor Manohar
 Vengal Rao

Production
Producers Jones and John Max announced the project during November 2015 and revealed that they would work on a horror film with director Vadivudaiyan, even before the release of their other collaboration, Sowkarpettai (2016). Bharath was signed on to portray the leading role, and the director noted that he would have a female makeover for certain portions of the film. The film began shooting during January 2016 in Chennai, with three actresses - Ineya, Namitha, and Manisha Yadav- signed to portray pivotal roles. Manisha Yadav was later replaced by Srushti Dange after an initial photoshoot was held, and was revealed to play the role of a medical student. Ineya was revealed to play the titular character, and Namitha stated she would play the antagonist.  Thambi Ramaiah was also cast.

In July 2016, the team shot scenes in the tribal area of Kolli Malai, where huge sets were erected at an altitude of 2,000 feet. Production was completed in mid-2017, with the film's release delayed several times as a result of an unavailability of screens.

Soundtrack

The music was composed by Amresh Ganesh.

Release
The movie was released on 8 March 2019, in Tamil as Pottu, in Telugu as Bottu and in Hindi as Bindi.

Reception

The Times of India rated the movie 1.5/5 stating, "Bharath, possessed by ghosts from the past, is out for revenge".

References

External links

2019 films
Indian ghost films
2019 comedy horror films
2010s Tamil-language films
Indian comedy horror films
Indian supernatural horror films
2010s supernatural horror films
Films directed by Vadivudaiyan